Standard Oil was an integrated oil producing, transporting, refining, and marketing company established in 1870 and split into multiple companies in 1911. Various buildings bear the Standard Oil name and multiple individual stations with this branding are historically notable:

Standard Oil Gasoline Station may refer to:

 Standard Oil Gasoline Station (Odell, Illinois), a historic gas station in Odell, Illinois, that lies along historic U.S. Route 66
 Standard Oil Gasoline Station (Plainfield, Illinois), a historic building once used as a gas station in Plainfield, Illinois
 Standard Oil Company Filling Station in Bowling Green, Kentucky
 Standard Oil Service Station in Plant City, Florida
Standard Oil Gasoline Station (Rochelle, Illinois)